In human mitochondrial genetics, the Haplogroup CZ is a human mitochondrial DNA (mtDNA) haplogroup.

Origin
Haplogroup CZ is a descendant of haplogroup M8 and is a parent to the haplogroups C and Z. The C and Z subclades share a common ancestor dated to approximately 36,500 years ago.

Distribution
Today, CZ is found in eastern Asian, Central Asian, Siberian, indigenous American, and European populations, and is most common in Siberian populations. It is  recognized by a genetic marker at 249d.

Subclades

Tree
This phylogenetic tree of haplogroup CZ subclades is based on the paper by Mannis van Oven and Manfred Kayser Updated comprehensive phylogenetic tree of global human mitochondrial DNA variation and subsequent published research.

M
M8
CZ
C
Z

See also
Genealogical DNA test
Genetic genealogy
Human mitochondrial genetics
Population genetics
Human mitochondrial DNA haplogroups

References

External links
General
Ian Logan's Mitochondrial DNA Site
Mannis van Oven's Phylotree

CZ